The British Library is located in Hyderabad, India, Established in 1979, it is among the most popular libraries in the city with a vast collection of encyclopaedias, geography, science, History and other books.

References

Libraries in Hyderabad, India
1979 establishments in Andhra Pradesh
Libraries established in 1979